German submarine U-2524 was a Type XXI U-boat (one of the "Elektroboote") of Nazi Germany's Kriegsmarine, built for service in World War II. She was ordered on 6 November 1943, and was laid down on 6 September 1944 at the Blohm & Voss yard at Hamburg, as yard number 2524. She was launched on 30 October 1944, and commissioned under the command of Kapitänleutnant Ernst von Witzendorff on 16 January 1945.

Design
Like all Type XXI U-boats, U-2524 had a displacement of  when at the surface and  while submerged. The submarine was powered by two MAN SE supercharged six-cylinder M6V40/46KBB diesel engines each providing , two Siemens-Schuckert GU365/30 double-acting electric motors each providing , and two Siemens-Schuckert silent running GV232/28 electric motors each providing .

U-2524 was fitted with six  torpedo tubes in the bow and four  C/30 anti-aircraft guns. She could carry twenty-three torpedoes or seventeen torpedoes and twelve mines. The complement was five officers and fifty-two men.

Fate
U-2524 was scuttled on 3 May 1945, in the Kattegat southeast of the island of Fehmarn as part of Operation Regenbogen. One man was killed but the rest of the crew survived.

References

Bibliography

External links
 

Type XXI submarines
U-boats commissioned in 1945
World War II submarines of Germany
1944 ships
Ships built in Hamburg
Operation Regenbogen (U-boat)
Maritime incidents in May 1945